Norvajärvi is a medium-sized lake in the Kemijoki main catchment area. It is located in the region Lapland in Finland.

See also
List of lakes in Finland

References

Lakes of Rovaniemi